Michael Dennis Bush  is a retired New Zealand police officer. He served as the New Zealand Commissioner of Police from April 2014 until April 2020.

Career 
Bush joined the New Zealand Police in 1978, working at both CIB and Frontline Policing. As he progressed through the ranks he was appointed to senior roles, including Liaison Officer for South East Asia. This position was held by Bush at the time of the 2004 Boxing Day tsunami. He was the first New Zealand official on the scene of this incident, arriving on Phuket to assist with relief. In the 2006 New Year Honours, he was appointed a Member of the New Zealand Order of Merit (MNZM) for his relief work. He was also awarded the New Zealand Special Service Medal (Asian Tsunami) recognising this work.

Upon appointment to the role of Commissioner of Police in 2014, Bush made several changes focused on operational models and culture. These included the introduction of a "Prevention First" operating model, where the primary focus of policing resources would be on crime prevention. Bush introduced additional core values of "Empathy" and "Valuing Diversity" in an effort to make cultural changes following the 2007 Commission of Inquiry into Police. Bush was reappointed to the role of commissioner in 2017 for a second term that ran until April 2020.

In the 2020 Queen's Birthday Honours, Bush was promoted to Companion of the New Zealand Order of Merit, for services to the New Zealand Police and the community.

The COVID-19 pandemic reached New Zealand at the end of Bush's tenure as Police Commissioner. Bush was appointed to lead the operational arm of the COVID-19 All-of-Government Response Group on 23 March 2020 and continued to hold this role after retiring from the New Zealand Police in April 2020.

Since leaving the police, Bush has been working as a private investigator.

Controversies 
In August 2014 Bush apologised on behalf of the police to the people of Ruatoki and Tūhoe following the actions of police in 2007 during the termination of the Operation Eight investigation into alleged terror activities. Tamati Kruger, acting as spokesman for Tūhoe, stated that the apology was well received by those present, however some iwi had declined to take part.

In 2017 it was revealed that Bush had been convicted in 1983 of a drink driving offence while off-duty. From 1991 onward, new rules were introduced where this conviction would have made Bush ineligible to join the police. It was revealed that Bush had followed the correct process that included disclosing this conviction to the State Services Commission prior to his appointment as a Deputy Commissioner.

Bush was a member of the State Services Commission panel that recommended the appointment of Wally Haumaha to a Deputy Commissioner role in June 2018. Bush was warned against this appointment by senior officers including Mike Clements, given the historic comments made by Haumaha in regards to the investigation of alleged offences against Louise Nicholas. A government inquiry into the appointment process by Mary Scholtens QC was announced to review the recruitment process, which led to Haumaha's appointment. The inquiry was welcomed by Bush.

References

External links

Year of birth missing (living people)
20th-century New Zealand public servants
21st-century New Zealand public servants
Living people
New Zealand Commissioners of Police
Companions of the New Zealand Order of Merit